Tadpoles is the third album by the Bonzo Dog Band. It is largely a compilation of their work from the television show Do Not Adjust Your Set, on which they were the house band. The US version of the album had a track list slightly different from that of the UK version: the US version removed "I'm the Urban Spaceman" and added "Readymades" the B-side of their follow-up single "Mr. Apollo".

The UK version was reissued on vinyl by Sunset Records in the early 1970s, re-titled "I'm the Urban Spaceman".

In 2007 the album was reissued on CD with its original title and artwork, by EMI with five bonus tracks.

Sleeve notes
The original LP sleeve had seven holes cut out of the front cover, and multiple images printed on an insert card (or inner sleeve of the US version) helped listeners to visualize what band members were thinking by moving the card back and forth.

Track listing

Bonus tracks on 2007 CD reissue
"Boo!" [Stanshall, Innes]
"Readymades" [Stanshall, Innes]
"Look At Me I'm Wonderful" [Stanshall]
"We Were Wrong" [Stanshall]
"The Craig Torso Christmas Show" (The Lady Is a Tramp/The Last Waltz/Calling All Workers) [Innes, Stanshall, Spear]

References 

1969 albums
Bonzo Dog Doo-Dah Band albums
Albums produced by Gus Dudgeon
Liberty Records albums
Imperial Records albums